Fort Hays State University (FHSU) is a public university in Hays, Kansas. It is the fourth-largest of the six state universities governed by the Kansas Board of Regents, with a total enrollment of approximately 15,100 students.

History 
FHSU was founded in 1902 as the Western Branch of Kansas State Normal School, which is now known as Emporia State University. The institution was originally located on the grounds of Fort Hays, a frontier military outpost that was closed in 1889. The university served the early settlers' needs for educational facilities in the new region. The first building closer to Hays was completed in 1904, at which time the university moved to its present location. The modern campus is still located on a portion of the former military reservation from the fort. FHSU was first to be founded as an agricultural based school but was then determined to be a normal school. The normal school was supposed to be supported in part by the agricultural experiment station. For years, the University Dairy Unit supplied the school cafeteria with fresh milk.

During the Great Flood of 1951, Big Creek, a tributary of the Kansas River, flooded nearly all of campus, forcing a midnight evacuation.

Presidents
 William S. Picken (1902–1913)
 William A. Lewis (1913–1933)
 Clarence E. Rarick (1933–1941)
 Lyman D. Wooster (1941–1949)
 Morton C. Cunningham (1949–1969)
 John W. Gustad (1969–1975)
 Gerald W. Tomanek (1975–1987)
 Edward H. Hammond (1987–2014)
 Mirta M. Martin (2014–2016)
 Mike Barnett (acting) (2016)
 Andy Tompkins (interim) (2016–2017)
 Tisa Mason (2017–present)

Attempted merger with Dodge City Community College
In March 2014, it was announced that Dodge City Community College might become part of Fort Hays State University under a proposal that would create the first public four-year degree-granting college in southwest Kansas. The college would have been known as Fort Hays State University at Dodge City had the plan been approved by the Kansas Board of Regents. Fort Hays faculty could have taught other four-year programs in Dodge City, while courses typically taken by college freshmen and sophomores would remain the same. The proposal would have also required $10 million to build a technical institute and $5 million per year in state funding. The proposal required approval from the Board of Regents, followed by the state Legislature and the governor.

On November 11, 2014, the community college's Board of Trustees voted 3–3 on a proposal that recommended that Fort Hays become an upper division college and technical institute in Dodge City, with the Dodge City college remaining independent. With this vote, the merger collapsed.

As of 2019 the university had a total enrollment of approximately 15,100 students with 4,648 attending on-campus programs; 6,882 participating in online programs; and 3,570 in the Chinese program.

The campus
The campus property includes more than 40 limestone-faced buildings. Big Creek, a winding stream that traverses the campus, not only enhances the beauty of the campus, but also serves as a natural laboratory for students in the biological sciences. Several businesses in downtown Hays cater specifically to FHSU students.

Buildings

The buildings of Fort Hays State University are all dedicated to someone or are an important part of FHSU's history.

Forsyth Library
In addition to supporting the general needs of faculty, staff and students, Forsyth Library has a large collection of fiction and nonfiction material about Kansas and the American West, supported in part by the Elmer and Eartha Pugh Trust Fund. Topics include railroads, the cattle industry, cowboys, Native Americans and frontier life.

The William D. Pashchal World War II History Collection, donated by retired dentist William Paschal, contains books, declassified government documents, maps, photographs, and other materials.

The library is also the repository for the books, papers and periodicals of the Fort Hays Genealogy Society.

Sternberg Museum of Natural History

The university's Sternberg Museum of Natural History features interactive natural science exhibitions, many traveling and temporary exhibitions, an acclaimed Discovery Room, and a Museum Store. The Sternberg Museum also includes more than 3.7 million specimens in collections of paleontology, geology, history, archaeology, ethnology, botany, entomology, ichthyology, herpetology, ornithology and mammalogy. One will find that all these major exhibits contain at least one creature/plant named after Sternberg.

The university's museum was renamed the Sternberg Memorial Museum after the death in 1969 of George F. Sternberg, who had developed it. The current museum was formed in 1991 when the university's museum was merged with the Museum of the High Plains.

The museum is the home of the famous Cretaceous fossil Gillicus in Xiphactinus, better known as the "fish within a fish," which shows a small fossil fish inside the stomach of a larger fossil fish.

In 2010, researchers at the museum showed that plankton-eating fish flourished in the ocean at the same time as the dinosaurs, filling in a 106-million-year gap in the fossil record. One of the authors of the paper was Mike Everhart, a curator of paleontology at the museum.

Academics 
FHSU comprises five colleges (Arts, Humanities and Social Sciences; Business and Entrepreneurship; Education; Health and Behavioral Sciences; and Science, Technology and Mathematics) which together have 31 departments and offer more than 60 academic majors for undergraduates and 20 for graduate students. Students at FHSU can obtain associate's degrees in office technology and radiologic technology; do their preprofessional study at FHSU then transfer to a medical or law school; obtain bachelor's and master's degrees; and in some areas of the curriculum, can earn specialist's degrees. FHSU also offers online degrees through its "Online College," a unit that evolved from the Department of Continuing Education and Learning Technology in 1999.

Docking Institute of Public Affairs
The Docking Institute is a public policy research institute whose mission is to enhance effective decision-making among governmental and non-profit leaders. The institute has six focus areas:
 Survey research, program evaluation research, public policy research, and community and economic development research
 Strategic planning and consulting
 Grants facilitation
 Economic and community development consulting
 Public administration training programs
 Public affairs programming (conferences, speakers, forums, media events, scholarly publications, etc.)

In addition, the university hosts the Sebelius Lecture Series each year. The series is named for former United States Representative Keith Sebelius, who graduated from Fort Hays State University in 1941. Each semester, Fort Hays State University invites nationally recognized leaders to the campus to serve as keynote speakers.

Athletics 

The Fort Hays State athletic teams are called the Tigers. The university is a member of the NCAA Division II ranks, primarily competing in the Mid-America Intercollegiate Athletics Association (MIAA) for most of its sports since the 2006–07 academic year; while its men's soccer team competes in the Great American Conference (GAC). The Tigers previously competed in the Rocky Mountain Athletic Conference (RMAC) from 1989–90 to 2005–06 (which they were a member on a previous stint from 1968–69 to 1971–72); in the Central States Intercollegiate Conference (CSIC) of the National Association of Intercollegiate Athletics (NAIA) from 1976–77 to 1988–89; in the Great Plains Athletic Conference (GPAC) from 1972–73 to 1975–76; in the Central Intercollegiate Athletic Conference (CIC) from 1923–24 to 1967–68; and in the Kansas Collegiate Athletic Conference (KCAC) from 1902–03 to 1922–23.

Fort Hays State competes in 18 intercollegiate varsity sports: Men's sports include baseball, basketball, cross country, football, golf, soccer, track & field (indoor and outdoor) and wrestling; while women's sports include basketball, cross country, golf, soccer, softball, tennis, track & field (indoor and outdoor) and volleyball.

Basketball
The Fort Hays State basketball programs hold four national basketball titles; the men's team claimed national championships in 1984 and 1985 (NAIA), back to back, and in 1996 (NCAA Division II) with a remarkable 34–0 record. The women's team also brought home the national title in 1991 (NAIA).

Cross country
The men's cross country program owns four national championships, all as a member of the NAIA, occurring in 1963, 1965, 1968, and 1969.

Baseball
The baseball program was NCAA Division II national runner-up in 2000.

Shooting sports
The FHSU shooting team won 3rd place in 2009 in the American Trap event at the National ACUI competition.

Mascot
The Tiger has been the mascot of FHSU since 1914. Its origin is unclear, but it may have been the brainchild of W.A. Lewis, the president of the Western Branch Normal School (FHSU). Many tigers have represented FHSU over the years, but on April 3, 2000, the current mascot was unveiled. It is now the only accepted image of the FHSU Tiger. At the annual TailGreat on September 9, 2000, the mascot was officially named Victor E. Tiger. The costumed tiger character, Victor E. Tiger, appears at sporting and university events and is currently worn by Dawna Evers, a senior at the university.

Oktoberfest and homecoming weekend
Each year, Fort Hays State holds a celebration called Oktoberfest. It is a celebration of the Volga German heritage of Ellis County. It is held at Frontier Park in downtown Hays on the Friday before FHSU's homecoming. For entertainment, there is polka music and various booths that serve a variety of German food and beer. The first keg is tapped around 11:00 a.m. which officially begins Oktoberfest. There is also a homecoming parade on Saturday morning where student organizations decorate floats or walk in the parade for FHSU spirit. The homecoming football game begins Saturday afternoon.

Student media
Student Media at Fort Hays is housed under the banner Tiger Media Network, which includes radio and TV, stemming from their website at tigermedianet.com.

Notable alumni
 Vashone Adams, NFL player
 Greg Anderson, personal trainer linked to the BALCO steroids scandal
 Sheila Frahm, Former Lieutenant Governor of Kansas and Former United States Senator
 Eric Ian Spoutz, art dealer; historian; museum curator
 Kris Kuksi, visual artist
 Lynn Lashbrook, President and Founder of SMWW
 M. T. Liggett, folk sculptor
 Kathryn McCarthy, U.S. Representative from Kansas
 Mike McCarthy, NFL Head Coach
 Tim McCarty, East Central University football coach
 Milton McGriggs, American football player
 Les Miller, NFL player
 Frankie Neal, NFL player
 Nola Ochs, world's oldest college graduate (95 in 2007)
 Pillar, band which formed at the university in 1998
 Nathan Shepherd, NFL player
 Jerry Simmons, NFL strength and conditioning coach for 23 years
 Jim Smallwood, Colorado State Senator
 Mickey Spillane, Detective novelist (freshman year only)

References

External links
 
 Fort Hays State Athletics website

 
Public universities and colleges in Kansas
Educational institutions established in 1902
Education in Ellis County, Kansas
Buildings and structures in Ellis County, Kansas
Tourist attractions in Ellis County, Kansas
1902 establishments in Kansas